Barnes Reeves Eason (November 19, 1914 – October 25, 1921), better known by his screen name B. Reeves Eason Jr. was an American silent film child actor. Billed as "Master Breezy Reeves Jr." and "Universal's Littlest Cowboy", and later also known as Breezy Eason Jr., he was the son of motion picture director and actor B. Reeves Eason and his wife, the actress Jimsy Maye.

Death
Eason was killed after being hit by a  truck outside of his parents' house after running into the street after a ball  shortly after the filming of the Harry Carey silent western The Fox (1921) had been completed. He was interred at Hollywood Forever Cemetery and was one of the first actors to be buried there.

Filmography
 Gold and the Woman (1916)
 Nine-Tenths of the Law (1918)
 The Kid and the Cowboy (1919)
 The Thunderbolt (1919)
 Two Kinds of Love (1920)
 Pink Tights (1920)
 The Lone Ranger (1920)
 Blue Streak McCoy (1920)
 His Nose in the Book (1920)
 Sure Fire (1921)
 The Fox (1921)
 The Big Adventure (1921)

See also

Paul Kelly
Bobby Connelly
Jackie Coogan

References

Bibliography
 Holmstrom, John. The Moving Picture Boy: An International Encyclopaedia from 1895 to 1995, Norwich, Michael Russell, 1996, pp. 67–68.

External links

1914 births
1921 deaths
20th-century American male actors
American male child actors
American male film actors
American male silent film actors
Burials at Hollywood Forever Cemetery
Male actors from Hollywood, Los Angeles
Road incident deaths in California

Child deaths